Dae Wihae (died 906) (reigned 894–906) was the 14th king of the 7th–10th century Balhae kingdom, which encompassed modern day Korea and some southern parts of northeast China.

Little is known of Dae Wihae, and some lists of Balhae monarchs do not include him, though his name does appear in the Chinese chronicle Tang Huiyao (唐會要). His temple name and era name are unknown.

It was not until 1940 that Dae Wihae's existence was confirmed, when Jin Yufu and other Chinese historians verified his name for the first time.

Though few records exist, it is thought that Dae Wihae made progress in diplomatic fields, having sent delegates,Baejeong(裵頲) to Japan, and osodo(烏炤度) to Tang Dynasty China, in 894 and 905 respectively. He had a son named Dae Bong-ye.

See also
List of Korean monarchs
History of Korea

References

External links
Empas entry, in Korean

Balhae rulers
906 deaths
9th-century rulers in Asia
10th-century rulers in Asia
Year of birth unknown